The  was a professional wrestling championship in the Japanese promotion Union Pro Wrestling (UPW) when it was a sub-brand of DDT Pro-Wrestling. The title was created in April 2013 by then UPW sponsor IdeaPocket.

There have been a total of five reigns and one vacancy shared between five different champions. The title was deactivated in 2015 when UPW folded.

Title history

See also

DDT Pro-Wrestling
Professional wrestling in Japan

References

DDT Pro-Wrestling championships
World professional wrestling championships